Elo or ELO may refer to:

Music
 Electric Light Orchestra, a British rock music group
 The Electric Light Orchestra (album), the group's debut album
 ELO 2, the group's second album
 ELO Part II, an offshoot band of Electric Light Orchestra

Biology
 ELO (gene) also known as Very-long-chain 3-oxoacyl-CoA synthase, an enzyme
 Eleorchis, an orchid genus abbreviated Elo in trade journals

People
 Elo (surname)

Other uses
 Elo, a member magazine for the Tuglas Society
 Elo, Wisconsin, an unincorporated community in the U.S.
 East Liverpool, Ohio, a city in the U.S.
 Elo rating system, a system for measuring the relative strength of players in chess and other two-player games
 World Football Elo Ratings, a ranking system for men's national teams in football, based on Elo rating system
 Eurolot, an airline, by ICAO airline designator
 Electronic Literature Organization, a nonprofit organisation promoting electronic literary works
 Saveasi'uleo, also known as Elo, a Samoan god who presides over Pulotu (the underworld)
 Elo (card association), a Brazilian payment card brand

Finnish-language surnames